Samuel Gardner (1891–1984) was an American composer.

Samuel Gardner may also refer to:

 Samuel H. Gardner, Allegheny County District Attorney for Pittsburgh
 Samuel Gardner (English politician)
Samuel Gardner (Georgia politician), representative elected to the Georgia Assembly during the Reconstruction era

See also
Sam Gardner (disambiguation)
Samuel Gardiner (disambiguation)
Samuel Paul Garner (1910–1996), American accounting scholar